The David di Donatello for Best Foreign Director is a category in the David di Donatello Awards, described as "Italy’s answer to the Oscars". It was awarded by the Accademia del Cinema Italiano (ACI, Academy of Italian Cinema) to recognize outstanding efforts on the part of non-Italian film directors during the year preceding the ceremony. The award was given from 1966 until 1990.

Winners and nominees
Winners are indicated in bold.

1960s
1966
 John Huston - The Bible: In the Beginning

1967
 David Lean - Doctor Zhivago

1968
 Richard Brooks - In Cold Blood

1969
 Roman Polanski - Rosemary's Baby

1970s
1970
 John Schlesinger - Midnight Cowboy

1971
 Claude Lelouch - Le Voyou

1972
 John Schlesinger - Sunday Bloody Sunday

1973
 Bob Fosse - Cabaret

1974
 Ingmar Bergman - Viskningar och rop

1975
 Billy Wilder - The Front Page

1976
 Miloš Forman - One Flew Over the Cuckoo's Nest

1977
 Akira Kurosawa - Dersu Uzala

1978
 Herbert Ross - The Goodbye Girl 
 Ridley Scott - The Duellists 

1979
 Miloš Forman - Hair

1980s
1980
 Francis Ford Coppola - Apocalypse Now

1981
 Akira Kurosawa - Kagemusha
 Pál Gábor - Angi Vera
 Martin Scorsese - Raging Bull

1982
 Margarethe von Trotta - Die bleierne Zeit
 István Szabó - Mephisto
 Warren Beatty - Reds

1983
 Steven Spielberg - E.T.: The Extra-Terrestrial
 Blake Edwards - Victor Victoria
 Costa Gavras - Missing

1984
 Ingmar Bergman - Fanny och Alexander
 Woody Allen - Zelig
 Andrzej Wajda - Danton

1985
 Miloš Forman - Amadeus
 Sergio Leone - Once Upon a Time in America
 Roland Joffé - The Killing Fields

1986
 Akira Kurosawa - Ran
 John Huston - Prizzi's Honor
 Sydney Pollack - Out of Africa
 Emir Kusturica - When Father Was Away on Business

1987
 James Ivory - A Room with a View
 Luis Puenzo - The Official Story
 Alain Cavalier - Thérèse

1988
 Louis Malle - Au revoir les enfants
 Stanley Kubrick - Full Metal Jacket
 John Huston - The Dead

1989
 Pedro Almodóvar - Mujeres al borde de un ataque de nervios
 Barry Levinson - Rain Man
 Woody Allen - Another Woman

1990s
1990
 Louis Malle - Milou en mai

References

External links
 
 David di Donatello official website

David di Donatello
Film directing awards